Government House, located on Government Hill in Central, Hong Kong, is the official residence of the Chief Executive of Hong Kong. It was constructed in 1855 as a Colonial Renaissance-style building, but was significantly remodelled during the Japanese occupation, resulting in the current hybrid Japanese-neoclassical form.

Government House was the official residence of the Governor from 1855 to 1997, when the territory was under British rule. Of the 28 governors of Hong Kong, 25 used this building as their official residence.

Located between Upper Albert Road and Lower Albert Road, Mid-Levels, Central, Government House is on a  plot of land. Its front elevation faces south towards the Peak, while right below its northern part are the former Central Government Offices (currently the Justice Place).

Government House is a declared monument under the Antiquities and Monuments Ordinance.

History/Timeline 

Government House was designed by Charles St George Cleverly. Construction started in 1851, eight years after Hong Kong became a British colony, and took four years to complete. The first Governor to live there was Sir John Bowring, the fourth Governor of the territory. The last one was the last Governor, Chris Patten.

Government House also housed the Legislative Council of Hong Kong from 1855 to the 1930s. The Council used the ballroom from 1891 onward

During the Japanese occupation during the Second World War (1941–1945), it was occupied by the Japanese Military Governor. The form of the building was changed to a hybrid Japanese/neoclassical image by Seichi Fujimura (藤村正一 Fujimura Seiichi) in 1944, primarily through the addition of a tower and roof elements.

On 16 September 1945, the Instrument of Surrender was signed at Government House.

The Japanese fittings of Government House were removed in 1946, but the tower remains to this day.

During 1947 to 1957, two sculptured stone lions were erected at the entrance.

During 1971 to 1982, a kidney-shaped swimming pool was built in the garden.

During 1982 to 1986, an ornamental pool with a fountain was created at the foot of the main stairs leading down from the north Veranda.

During 1987 to 1992, a small pergola on the lower terrace was erected and the water feature of the main garden staircase was converted into an impressive planter.

Government House was declared a monument in 1995 under the Antiquities and Monuments Ordinance.

After the handover of Hong Kong to the People's Republic of China in 1997, the House became a reception for ceremonies (such as the conferring of Honours and formal banquets). Tung Chee Hwa, the first chief executive, did not reside in Government House but rather at Grenville House.

During 1997 to 2005, a bonsai gallery was introduced in the Veranda.

Donald Tsang, the second Chief Executive, moved into Government House in January 2006, following extensive renovations. The Standard criticised that the renovation cost was estimated at HK$14.5 million, including a sum of HK$300,000 allocated to a new fish pond designed to accommodate Tsang's collection of koi.

During 2005 to 2012, an outdoor fish pond was added in the back garden.

During 2012 to 2017, three-bin composting system was added in the back garden.

In 2017, one of the tennis courts was converted into a Landscaped Area.

In 2022, HK$2.8 million was spent to renovate the house, before John Lee moved in.

Major features

Exterior
The main entrance of the house faces south towards Victoria Peak. Down on the northern side is the Former Central Government Offices, where most government secretariat offices were situated until 2011.

The carriage porch at the front with granite frames is a notable architectural feature of Government House

The exterior of Government House is plastered in Art Deco style. Government House has its unique character and historical meanings with a blend of different architectural styles added on over more than a century.

Garden
Government House has a front lawn and a back garden with dazzling flowers. Originally planted in 1919, the multi-coloured azaleas bloom every spring. There is also a rare species of tree, Brownea grandiceps (Rose of Venezuela), originating from South America and listed in the Register of Old and Valuable Trees of the Leisure and Cultural Services Department. Seven metres tall, with a crown spread of nine metres, this tree has been maintained in superb condition by the dedicated horticultural staff. Indeed, there are many mature trees on the grounds. Among those trees stands the giant Litchi chinensis.

The garden also features a kidney-shaped swimming pool and an outdoor fish pond.

Interior
Ballroom - The Ballroom is used for hosting banquets for guests from home and abroad. It is also the venue for the Honours and Awards Presentation Ceremony and various community engagement activities.

Dining Room - The Dining Room is used for banquets of smaller scale for guests from home and abroad.

Drawing Room - The Drawing Room is used for receiving guests and holding meetings. Its walls and ceilings are embellished with exquisite plaster mouldings.

Gate Lodges and Government House Guards 
At the front entrance on Upper Albert Road, there are two buildings with an iron gate known as the Gate Lodges. Built in 1855, they are the oldest structures of Government House. They were designed by Surveyor General Charles St. George Cleverly who was in charge of the construction of the first generation of Government House in the 1850s. The lodges once housed the Government House Guards, who stood in front of the house and protected the Governor of Hong Kong. Various units of the British Army stationed in Hong Kong were used as guard units.

 1st Battalion of the Queen's Royal Surrey Regiment 1962-63
 C Company of the 1st Battalion of the Duke of Edinburgh’s Royal Regiment Berkshire and Wiltshire

Following the handover in 1997, officers of the Hong Kong Police have guarded the building.

Open days 

The garden of Government House is opened twice a year to the public. At least one will be arranged in spring to enable members of the public to share the delight in viewing the full bloom of the azaleas. Visitors are usually allowed to pass by the drawing room, dining room and ballroom where key official functions are held.

The open days are generally arranged during weekends. Dates are announced through press releases one week in advance. No admission fee is charged.

Booking 
The ballroom of Government House was made available in the 1990s on three Fridays each month for bookings by charitable, non-profit or public organisations to host events that benefit the community. The nature of the event under application must be well-matched with the identity of Government House as an important historical monument of Hong Kong and with its status as a dignified location for the Hong Kong Government to hold official functions. In early 2006, the Chief Executive moved into Government House and used it as official residence and office. Most of the staff in the Chief Executive's Office have also been relocated to Government House to support the Chief Executive. Since then, Government House is no longer available for booking due to security and operational reasons.

Other official residences 
In 1900, Mountain Lodge, on Victoria Peak, was built as an alternate summer home for the Governor, a role it retained until 1934. The building survived until 1946, but today only the Gate Lodge and Victoria Peak Garden remain. One of three "GOVERNOR'S RESIDENCE" marking stones of the former Mountain Lodge was erected in the small flower bed in front of the entrance of the Government House in 1980.

From 1934, Fanling Lodge, in the New Territories, was used as a summer residence for the Governor. It has retained this role, and is now the alternative residence of the Chief Executive of Hong Kong. The Lodge is occupied mainly at weekends and on holidays.

Feng shui 
According to The New York Times, alleged bad feng shui was the reason Tung Chee Hwa refused to live or work in Government House upon becoming Chief Executive. During his terms as Chief Executive, he was still heavily criticised by Hong Kongers, and his popularity fell well below 40% by the time of his resignation.

The Standard believed Tung's reason to stay away from the mansion was political: a subtle effort to reduce the age-old British legacy over Hong Kong. Other sources mention that "it was the warning about spying devices [installed throughout Government House] that scared him away".

Staff 
There are 20 housekeeping positions at the house. The senior chef is paid around HK$30,000 per month.

See also 

 Government House
 Government Houses of the British Empire
 Governor of Hong Kong
 History of Hong Kong
 List of buildings and structures in Hong Kong
 List of official residences

References

External links 

 Government House, official website
 Government House , Hong Kong Antiquities and Monuments Office

Declared monuments of Hong Kong
Landmarks in Hong Kong
Central, Hong Kong
Official residences in Hong Kong
Government buildings in Hong Kong
Government Hill
Government Houses of the British Empire and Commonwealth
Houses completed in 1855
Official residences of subnational executives
Imperial Crown Style architecture